Nonyma strigata is a species of beetle in the family Cerambycidae. It was described by Pascoe in 1864.

References

strigata
Beetles described in 1864